, better known by his ring name Tetsuya Yamato, is a Japanese kickboxer. He currently competes in the super lightweight division of K-1, where he is the reigning K-1 Super Lightweight champion. 

Yamato is the former WBC Muaythai and Lion Fight super lightweight champion, the former NJKF lightweight champion, as well as the K-1 WORLD MAX 2010 Lightweight Japan Tournament winner.

As of January 2023, he is ranked as the fourth best featherweight (-66 kg) kickboxer in the world by Combat Press and the eight best super featherweight (-67.5 kg) by Beyond Kick. Combat Press has ranked him as a top ten featherweight since April 2022 and previously ranked him in the featherweight top ten between July and October 2015.

Background
Yamato was born in Chita, Aichi, Japan on December 10, 1987 as Tetsuya Iwashita. He took the name Yamato in honour of his gym, Yamato Kickboxing Gym. After graduating from high school he started working in construction, and became a painter to coat buildings with coloured acrylic resin.

Kickboxing career

Early career
On July 31, 2005, he made his debut as a professional kickboxer in the RISE organization, and he knocked out Eiji Ogawa in the first round with a left low kick. After this bout he signed NJKF and started fighting under their banner. His second fight was on September 24  at NJKF "Infinity Challenge VIII" against Takuya Minekawa, which he won by a third-round technical knockout.

On January 15, 2006, Yamato was chosen and awarded the 2005 Rookie Award by NJKF.

After Yamato's career of three years with NJKF, he was asked to compete for the vacant NJKF Lightweight title in 2008, in a four-man tournament. He fought against Hiromi Nakayama in the semi-final at NJKF "Start Of New Legend II" on March 8. He won by a technical knockout in the fourth round because of a cut by an elbow strike. He fought against Hanawa in the tournament title at NJKF "Start Of New Legend IX" on July 27, 2008, and he knocked him out in the first round with a left hook.

On January 25, 2009, Yamato was chosen and awarded 2008 MVP by NJKF and Bout Review.

In the middle of 2009, he was asked to participate in the WBC Muaythai Japanese Championship Tournament as a lightweight, as the New Japanese Kickboxing Federation, Martial Arts Japan Kickboxing Federation and Japan Professional Muaythai Committee announced that they were going to establish a unified championships sanctioned by WBC Muaythai.

On September 23, he fought against Kazuya Oe in the semi-final, and he knocked him out with body shot in the 2nd round. In the tournament final on December 4, he fought against Yūdai Kono for the inaugural WBC Muaythai Japanese title. He won by technical knockout due to cut, as the bout was stopped by a doctor in the fourth round.

On January 24, 2010, he was awarded the 2009 Outstanding Performance Award by NJKF.

On March 14, 2010, Yamato fought against Saenchai Sor Kingstar from Thailand in Los Angeles, USA to challenge the vacant world lightweight title sanctioned by Muay Thai Association of America. He was knocked out by left high kick in the first round.

K-1

2010 K-1 MAX Japan Tournament
Yamato took part in the 2010 K-1 World MAX Lightweight Japan Tournament and faced the 2009 Krush Lightweight tournament winner Masahiro Yamamoto in the Round of 16 bout, which took place on May 2, 2010. The fight was ruled a majority decision draw after the first two rounds, with one judge scoring the bout in favor of Yamato. Yamato was awarded the unanimous decision after the extra fourth round was contested, with all three judges scoring the bout 10–7 in his favor. He twice knocked Yamamoto down in the final round, the first time with a right hook and the second time with a knee to the body.

Yamato faced the RISE super featherweight champion Yuki in the quarterfinals of the Japan Tournament final, which took place on July 5, 2010. He knocked his opponent out with a counter left hook in the final seconds of the opening round. Yamato faced Kizaemon Saiga in the semifinals. After an even first round that was scored 10–10 by all three judges, Yamato was able to floor Saiga with a left hook near the end of the next round. Yamato captured the tournament title with a third-round knockout of Yuta Kubo in the finals.

Between the tournaments
Yamato faced the undefeated Koya Urabe at Krush.10 on September 20, 2010. In front of an audience of 1,800 people, he lost the fight by unanimous decision, with all three judges scoring the bout 30–26 in favor of Urabe. Yamato was knocked down in the first round with a right straight. Yamato next faced the former mixed martial artist, who was making his kickboxing debut, Akiyo Nishiura at Dynamite!! 2010 on December 31, 2010. The fight was ruled a majority decision draw, with one judge scoring it for Yamato. He returned to his winning ways in his next fight, as he overcame Makoto Nishiyama by a second-round technical knockout at New Japan Blood 3 on May 21, 2011.

2011 K-1 MAX Japan Tournament
Yamato participated in the K-1 World MAX 2011 -63kg Japan Tournament Final as well, which took place on June 25, 2011. He faced the inaugural Krush super lightweight champion Hiroya in the quarterfinals. Yamato won the fight by unanimous decision, with three scorecards of 29–28. He advanced to the semifinals, where he faced Koya Urabe, who had beaten him by unanimous decision just nine months prior. Yamato once again suffered a unanimous decision loss, with scores of 30–28, 29–28 and 30–28.

Yamato faced the two-time Rajadamnern Stadium champion Jomthong Chuwattana at WBC Japan 2: The Path to the World Champion on October 3, 2011. He won the fight by unanimous decision, with all three judges scoring the bout 50–47 for him. Yamato faced Ryuji Kajiwara for the Krush Lightweight Championship  at Krush.14 on December 9, 2011, but lost via unanimous decision.

NJKF

WBC Muaythai International Champion
Yamato knocked out former Lumpinee Stadium champion Densiam Lookprabaht in the first round on February 18, 2012. Yamato won his next bout as well, as he beat Sergio Wielzen by unanimous decision at Hoost Cup: Feast of the Kings on May 20, 2012.

Yamato challenged the WBC Muay Thai Japan Super Lightweight champion Seiji Takahashi at NJKF: Kick to the Future 3 on June 24, 2012. The winner of the bout was furthermore guaranteed a chance to fight for the vacant WBC Muaythai International title as well. Yamato won the fight by unanimous decision. 

He was scheduled to face Leo Monteiro for the vacant WBC Muaythai International Super Lightweight Championship on September 22, 2012 at NJKF's Kick to the Future 6 in Tokyo, Japan. Monteiro was replaced by Paul Karpowicz, however. Yamato defeated Karpowicz via unanimous decision (49-48, 49-48, 50-48) to win the title.

Yamato faced Gansuwan Sasiprapa at NJFK 2013 1st on February 17, 2013. He lost the fight by unanimous decision. After suffering a technical knockout loss due to cut to Sagetdao Petpayathai on May 16, 2013, Yamato was booked to face Kevin Ross at Lion Fight 11 on September 20, 2013. He won the fight by split decision.

Yamato made his first WBC Muaythai International Super Lightweight title defense against Masaaki Noiri at NJKF 2014 1st on February 16, 2014. He retained the belt by unanimous decision, with scores of 49–47, 50–47 and 49–48. Yamato opened a cut above Noiri's right eye with an elbow strike in the second round. The ringside physician was immediately called in to check whether Noiri can continue competing allowed the bout to resume.

WBC Muaythai World Champion
Yamato challenged the WBC Muaythai World Super Lightweight champion Sagetdao Petpayathai at NJKF 2014 8th on November 15, 2014. Despite being knocked down with an elbow in the third round, Yamato was able to land an elbow strike of his own which opened a cut on Sagetdao. This cut was examined by the ringside physician, who advised the referee to stop the fight.

Yamato challenged Kevin Ross for the Lion Fight Super Lightweight Championship at Lion Fight 21 on March 27, 2015. The bout was a rematch of their fight, which took place on September 20, 2013, that Yamato won by split decision. Yamato won the fight by a first-round technical knockout, stopping Ross with elbows near the end of the opening frame.

Yamato faced Kongsak Sitboonmee in a non-title bout at NJKF 2015 3rd on May 10, 2015. He lost the fight by unanimous decision, with scores of 49–48, 49–48 and 49–47. Following this stumble, Yamato made his maiden WBC Muaythai World Super Lightweight title defense against Aranchai Kiatpatarapan at NJKF 2015 6th on September 27, 2015. He lost the fight by decision.

Yamato faced Pakorn PKSaenchaimuaythaigym at Hoost Cup Kings Nagoya on December 27, 2015. He won the fight by majority decision. Yamato next faced Liam Harrison for the vacant Yokkao World 65kg championship at Yokkao 17 on March 19, 2016. He lost the fight by decision.

Return to K-1

Early fights
Yamato fought a rematch with Hiroya at K-1 World GP 2017: Super Bantamweight Tournament on April 22, 2017. He won the fight by a second-round knockout. Yamato next faced Elson Patrick at Krush.79 in Nagoya on August 20, 2017. He once again won the fight by stoppage, as he floored Patrick with a right straight at the 2:05 minute mark of the second round. Yamato extended his win streak to three consecutive fights with a first round knockout of Jun Nakazawa at K-1 World GP 2017 Heavyweight Championship Tournament on November 23, 2017.

These three victories earned Yamato the right to challenge for the title, as he was booked to face the K-1 Super Lightweight champion Masaaki Noiri at K-1 World GP 2018: K'FESTA.1 on March 21, 2018. He previously beat Noiri by unanimous decision on February 16, 2014. Yamato failed to replicate his earlier success, as he lost the fight by a third-round knockout. He was twice knocked down prior to the stoppage, with a flying knee in the first round and with a flurry of punches in the third round.

Yamato faced Cui Jianhui at Krush 92 on August 18, 2018. He won the fight by a second-round knockout. This earned him a place in the 2018 K-1 Super Lightweight Grand Prix, which took place on November 3, 2018. Yamato faced the 2014 and 2016 K-1 Super Lightweight Grand Prix winner in the quarterfinals of the one-day tournament. He lost the fight by a first-round knockout.

Yamato faced Kensei Kondo at K-1 World GP 2019: Japan vs World 5 vs 5 & Special Superfight in Osaka on August 24, 2019. He won the fight by unanimous decision. This would prove to be his only victory in two years, as he would then suffer three losses back to back: to Fukashi Mizutani on December 28, 2019, to Daizo Sasaki on December 13, 2020 and Tapruwan Hadesworkout on July 11, 2021.

Super Lightweight Champion
Yamato was scheduled to face Hideaki Yamazaki for the K-1 World GP Super Lightweight Championship at K-1: K'Festa 5 on April 3, 2022. He won the title by first-round knockout. Yamato landed a left hook with 50 seconds into the bout, which left Yamazaki unable to rise from the canvas. The stoppage was later given "Knockout of the Year" honors by K-1.

Yamato made his first title defense against the Krush Super Lightweight champion Daizo Sasaki at K-1 World GP 2022 Yokohamatsuri on June 17, 2022. He had lost to Sasaki by unanimous decision two years prior. Yamato won the rematch by unanimous decision, with scores of 30–28, 30–28 and 29–28.

Yamato made his second title defense against the one-time K-1 Lightweight champion Kenta Hayashi at K-1 World GP 2023: K'Festa 6 on March 12, 2023. He won the fight by unanimous decision, with scores of 29–27, 29–28 and 30–27. Yamato scored the sole knockdown of the fight in the first round, as he was able to knock Hayashi down with a right cross.

Titles
Lion Fight
2015 Lion Fight World Super Lightweight Championship
World Boxing Council Muaythai
2014 WBC Muaythai World Super Lightweight (-63.5 kg/140 lb) Championship
2012 WBC Muaythai International Super Lightweight Championship
2012 WBC Muaythai Japanese Super Lightweight Championship
2009 WBC Muaythai Japanese Lightweight Championship
K-1
2022 K-1 World GP Super Lightweight Championship
Two successful title defenses
2010 K-1 WORLD MAX 2010 -63kg Japan Tournament Winner
World Muaythai Council
2009 WMC Intercontinental Lightweight champion
New Japan Kickboxing Federation
 2008 NJKF Lightweight Championship
Awards
New Japan Kickboxing Federation
 2009 NJKF "Outstanding Performance Award"
 2008 NJKF "Fighter of the Year"
 2005 NJKF "Rookie of the Year"
eFight.jp
2x Fighter of the Month (February, November 2014)
Combat Press
 2017 Comeback Fighter of the Year
K-1
 2022 K-1 Knockout of the Year

Fight record

|-  style="text-align:center; background:#cfc;"
| 2023-03-12 || Win ||align=left| Kenta Hayashi || K-1 World GP 2023: K'Festa 6 || Tokyo, Japan || Decision (Unanimous) || 3 || 3:00  || 44–20–1
|-
! style=background:white colspan=9 |
|-  style="text-align:center; background:#cfc;" 
| 2022-09-11 || Win || align=left| Daizo Sasaki ||  K-1 World GP 2022 Yokohamatsuri  || Yokohama, Japan || Decision (Unanimous) || 3 || 3:00 || 43–20–1
|-
! style=background:white colspan=9 |
|- style="background:#cfc" 
| 2022-04-03 ||Win ||align=left| Hideaki Yamazaki || K-1: K'Festa 5 || Tokyo, Japan || KO (Left hook) || 1 || 0:50|| 42–20–1
|-
! style=background:white colspan=9 |
|-  style="text-align:center; background:#cfc"
| 2021-12-04 ||Win || align=left| Yujiro Ono || K-1 World GP 2021 in Osaka || Osaka, Japan || KO (Punches)|| 3 ||0:28 || 41–20–1
|-  style="background:#FFBBBB;"
| 2021-07-11 || Loss || align=left| Tapruwan Hadesworkout || NJKF - Yamato Gym 50th Anniversary Yamato Matsuri  || Nagoya, Japan || TKO (Doctor Stoppage) || 1 || 2:32 || 40–20–1
|-  style="background:#FFBBBB;"
| 2020-12-13 || Loss || align=left| Daizo Sasaki||  K-1 World GP 2020 Winter's Crucial Bout  || Tokyo, Japan || Decision (Unanimous) || 3 || 3:00 || 40–19–1
|-  bgcolor="#FFBBBB"
| 2019-12-28|| Loss||align=left| Fukashi || K-1 World GP 2019 Japan: ～Women's Flyweight Championship Tournament～ || Nagoya, Japan || KO (Punches) || 2 || 0:34 || 40–18–1
|- style="background:#cfc;"
| 2019-08-24|| Win ||align=left| Kensei Kondo || K-1 World GP 2019: Japan vs World 5 vs 5 & Special Superfight in Osaka || Osaka, Japan || Decision (Unanimous) || 3 || 3:00 || 40–17–1
|-  
|-  bgcolor="#FFBBBB"
| 2018-11-03 || Loss || align=left| Kaew Weerasakreck || K-1 World GP 2018: 3rd Super Lightweight Championship Tournament, Quarter Finals || Saitama Prefecture, Japan || KO (Left High Kick) || 1 || 1:30 || 39–17–1
|-  bgcolor="#CCFFCC"
| 2018-08-18 || Win || align=left| Cui Jianhui || Krush 92 || Japan || KO (Left Hook to the Body) || 2 || 2:46|| 39-16-1
|-  bgcolor="#FFBBBB"
| 2018-03-21 || Loss || align=left| Masaaki Noiri || K-1 World GP 2018: K'FESTA.1 || Saitama, Japan || KO (Punches) || 3 || 2:55|| 38–16–1
|-  
! style=background:white colspan=9 |
|-
|-  bgcolor="#CCFFCC"
| 2017-11-23 || Win ||align=left| Jun Nakazawa  || K-1 World GP 2017 Heavyweight Championship Tournament, Superfight || Saitama, Japan || KO (Left Hook)  || 1 || 2:24 || 38–15–1
|-
|-  bgcolor="#CCFFCC"
| 2017-08-20 || Win ||align=left| Elson Patrick || Krush.79 in Nagoya || Nagoya, Japan || KO (Straight Right) || 2 || 2:05 || 37–15–1
|-
|-  bgcolor="#CCFFCC"
| 2017-04-22 || Win ||align=left| Hiroya || K-1 World GP 2017: Super Bantamweight Tournament  || Tokyo, Japan || KO (Left hook) || 2 || 1:06 || 36–15–1
|-
|-  bgcolor="#FFBBBB"
| 2016-08-07|| Loss ||align=left| Petchtanong Banchamek || Kunlun Fight 49 / Rebels 45 - 65 kg 2016 Tournament 1/8 Finals || Tokyo, Japan || Decision || 3 || 3:00 || 35–15–1
|-
|-  bgcolor="#FFBBBB"
| 2016-03-19 || Loss ||align=left| Liam Harrison || Yokkao 17 || Bolton, England || Decision || 5 || 3:00 || 35–14–1
|-
! style=background:white colspan=9 |
|-
|-  bgcolor="#CCFFCC"
| 2015-12-27|| Win ||align=left| Pakorn PKSaenchaimuaythaigym || Hoost Cup Kings Nagoya || Nagoya, Japan || Decision (Majority) || 5 || 3:00 || 35–13–1
|-
|-  bgcolor="#FFBBBB"
| 2015-09-27 || Loss ||align=left| Aranchai Kiatpatarapan || NJKF 2015 6th || Japan || Decision || 5 || 3:00 || 34–13–1
|-
! style=background:white colspan=9 |
|-
|-  bgcolor="#FFBBBB"
| 2015-05-10 || Loss ||align=left| Kongsak Sitboonmee || NJKF 2015 3rd || Japan || Decision (Unanimous) || 5 || 3:00 || 34–12–1
|-
|-  bgcolor="#CCFFCC"
| 2015-03-27 || Win ||align=left| Kevin Ross || Lion Fight 21 || Temecula, CA || TKO (Elbows) || 1 || 2:43 || 34–11–1
|-
! style=background:white colspan=9 |
|-
|-  bgcolor="#CCFFCC"
| 2014-11-15 || Win ||align=left| Sagetdao Petpayathai || NJKF 2014 8th || Tokyo, Japan || TKO (cut) || 3 || 1:53 || 33–11–1
|-
! style=background:white colspan=9 |
|-
|-  bgcolor="#CCFFCC"
| 2014-07-21 || Win ||align=left| Faipa Sitboonmee || NJKF || Tokyo, Japan || TKO (Ref stoppage) || 3 || 3:00 || 32–11–1
|-
|-  bgcolor="#CCFFCC"
| 2014-02-16 || Win ||align=left| Masaaki Noiri || NJKF 2014 1st || Tokyo, Japan || Decision (unanimous) || 5 || 3:00 || 31–11–1
|-
! style=background:white colspan=9 |
|-
|-  bgcolor="#CCFFCC"
| 2013-09-20 || Win ||align=left| Kevin Ross || Lion Fight 11 || Las Vegas, Nevada, USA || Decision (split) || 5 || 3:00 || 30–11–1
|-
|-  bgcolor="#FFBBBB"
| 2013-05-16 || Loss ||align=left| Sagetdao Petpayathai || M-One: Reborn || Highland, California, USA || TKO (cut) || 4 || 1:38 || 29–11–1
|-  bgcolor="#FFBBBB"
| 2013-02-17 || Loss ||align=left| Gansuwan Sasiprapa || NJFK 2013 1st || Tokyo, Japan || Decision(unanimous) || 3 || 3:00 || 29–10–1
|-  bgcolor="#CCFFCC"
| 2012-09-22 || Win ||align=left| Paul Karpowicz || NJKF: Kick to the Future 6 || Tokyo, Japan || Decision (unanimous) || 5 || 3:00 || 29–9–1
|-
! style=background:white colspan=9 |
|-
|-  bgcolor="#CCFFCC"
| 2012-06-24 || Win ||align=left| Seiji Takahashi || NJKF: Kick to the Future 3 || Tokyo, Japan || Decision (unanimous) || 5 || 3:00 || 28–9–1
|-
! style=background:white colspan=9 |
|-
|-  bgcolor="#CCFFCC"
| 2012-05-20 || Win ||align=left| Sergio Wielzen || Hoost Cup: Feast of the Kings || Nagoya, Japan || Decision (unanimous) || 3 || 3:00 || 27–9–1
|-  bgcolor="#CCFFCC"
| 2012-02-18 || Win ||align=left| Densiam Lukprabaht || NJKF: Kick to the Future 1 || Tokyo, Japan || KO (Punches) || 1 || 2:28 || 26–9–1
|-  bgcolor="#FFBBBB"
| 2011-12-09 || Loss ||align=left| Ryuji Kajiwara || Krush.14 || Tokyo, Japan || Decision (Unanimous) || 3 || 3:00 ||25–9–1
|-
! style=background:white colspan=9 |
|-
|-  bgcolor="#FFBBBB"
| 2011-10-03 || Loss ||align=left| Jomthong Chuwattana || WBC Japan 2: The Path to the World Champion || Tokyo, Japan || Decision (Unanimous) || 5 || 3:00 ||25–8–1
|-  bgcolor="#CCFFCC"
| 2011-08-14 || Win ||align=left| Sugar Cane Coke Chunawat || M-1 Grand Muay Thai Championship || Los Angeles, California, USA || TKO (Cut) || 3 || 2:24 || 25–7–1
|-  bgcolor="#FFBBBB"
| 2011-06-25 || Loss ||align=left| Koya Urabe || K-1 World MAX 2011 -63kg Japan Tournament Final, Semi final || Tokyo, Japan || Decision (Unanimous) || 3 || 3:00 ||24–7–1
|-  bgcolor="#CCFFCC"
| 2011-06-25 || Win ||align=left| Hiroya || K-1 World MAX 2011 -63kg Japan Tournament Final, Quarter final || Tokyo, Japan || Decision (Unanimous) || 3 || 3:00 || 24–6–1
|-  bgcolor="#CCFFCC"
| 2011-05-21 || Win ||align=left| Makoto Nishiyama || New Japan Blood 3 || Tokyo, Japan || TKO (Ref stop/three knockdowns) || 2 || 1:30 ||23–6–1
|-  bgcolor=#c5d2ea
| 2010-12-31 || Draw ||align=left| Akiyo Nishiura || Dynamite!! 2010 || Saitama, Japan || Decision (Majority Draw) || 3 || 5:00 ||22–6–1
|-  bgcolor="#FFBBBB"
| 2010-09-20 || Loss ||align=left| Koya Urabe  || GoodLoser "Krush.10" || Bunkyō, Tokyo, Japan || Decision (Unanimous) || 3 || 3:00 ||22–6
|-  bgcolor="#CCFFCC"
| 2010-07-05 || Win ||align=left| Yuta Kubo || K-1 World MAX 2010 -63kg Japan Tournament Final, Final || Shibuya, Tokyo, Japan || KO (Left hook) || 3 || 1:26 ||22–5
|-
! style=background:white colspan=9 |
|-
|-  bgcolor="#CCFFCC"
| 2010-07-05 || Win ||align=left| Kizaemon Saiga || K-1 World MAX 2010 -63kg Japan Tournament Final, Semi-final || Shibuya, Tokyo, Japan || KO (Left hook) || 2 || 2:13 ||21–5
|-  bgcolor="#CCFFCC"
| 2010-07-05 || Win ||align=left| Yuki || K-1 World MAX 2010 -63kg Japan Tournament Final, Quarter-final || Shibuya, Tokyo, Japan || KO (Left hook) || 1 || 3:03 ||20–5
|-  bgcolor="#CCFFCC"
| 2010-05-02 || Win ||align=left| Masahiro Yamamoto || K-1 World MAX 2010 -63kg Japan Tournament Final 16 || Bunkyō, Tokyo, Japan || Decision (Unanimous) || 4(Ex.1) || 3:00 ||19–5
|-  bgcolor="#FFBBBB"
| 2010-03-14 || Loss ||align=left| Saenchai Sor Kingstar || World Champion Muay Thai Extravaganza || El Monte, California, United States || KO (Left high kick) || 1 || 2:13 ||18–5
|-
! style=background:white colspan=9 |
|-
|-  bgcolor="#CCFFCC"
| 2009-12-23 || Win ||align=left| Ratchayothin Sangmorakot || Yamato gym 40th & Nagoya JK Factory 20th Anniversary: "The Origin Of Kick Boxing" || Nagoya, Aichi, Japan || KO (Left body shot) || 3 || 1:05 ||18–4
|-  bgcolor="#CCFFCC"
| 2009-12-04 || Win ||align=left| Yūdai Kōno || MAJKF "Break Through-14" || Bunkyō, Tokyo, Japan || TKO (Doctor stop/cut) || 4 || 2:22 ||17–4
|-
! style=background:white colspan=9 |
|-
|-  bgcolor="#FFBBBB"
| 2009-10-12 || Loss ||align=left| Densiam Lookprabath || NJKF "MuayThai Open 9" || Bunkyō, Tokyo, Japan || Decision (Unanimous) || 5 || 3:00 ||16–4
|-  bgcolor="#CCFFCC"
| 2009-09-23 || Win ||align=left| Kazuya Ōe || NJKF "Road To Real King 11"  || Bunkyō, Tokyo, Japan || KO || 2 || 2:15 ||16–3
|-  bgcolor="#CCFFCC"
| 2009-07-19 || Win ||align=left| Kaensak Sor.Ploenjit || Ultimate Warriors || Anaheim, California, United States || KO (Left body shot) || 5 || 2:59 ||15–3
|-
! style=background:white colspan=9 |
|-
|-  bgcolor="#CCFFCC"
| 2009-07-05 || Win ||align=left| Maki Lansayam || Nagoyakick "Summer Fes.09 Freedom" || Nagoya, Aichi, Japan || TKO (Cut) || 2 || 2:30 ||14–3
|-  bgcolor="#CCFFCC"
| 2009-04-12 || Win ||align=left| Sohta || MAJKF "Break Though-10" || Bunkyō, Tokyo, Japan || KO (Right cross) || 1 || 2:32 ||13–3
|-  bgcolor="#CCFFCC"
| 2008-12-23 || Win ||align=left| Pathiban Sor.Kobayashi || Nagoyakick " DrumRoll Please!!" || Nagoya, Aichi, Japan || Decision (Unanimous) || 5 || 3:00 ||12–3
|-  bgcolor="#CCFFCC"
| 2008-11-09 || Win ||align=left| Yasutaku || NJKF "Start Of New Legend XIII" || Bunkyō, Tokyo, Japan || TKO (Doctor stoppage/Cut) || 3 || 1:51 ||11–3
|-  bgcolor="#CCFFCC"
| 2008-07-27 || Win ||align=left| Hanawa || NJKF "Start Of New Legend IX" || Bunkyō, Tokyo, Japan || KO (Left hook) || 1 || 0:42 ||10–3
|-
! style=background:white colspan=9 |
|-
|-  bgcolor="#CCFFCC"
| 2008-03-08 || Win ||align=left| Hiromi Nakayama || NJKF "Start Of New Legend II"  || Bunkyō, Tokyo, Japan || TKO (Referee stoppage/Cut) || 4 || 1:16 ||9–3
|-  bgcolor="#FFBBBB"
| 2007-11-23 || Loss ||align=left| Kanongsukk Weerasakreck || NJKF "Fighting Evolution XIII" || Bunkyō, Tokyo, Japan || KO (Right cross) || 2 || 2:46||8–3
|-  bgcolor="#CCFFCC"
| 2007-09-02 || Win ||align=left| Ikki || NJKF "Fighting Evolution X" || Bunkyō, Tokyo, Japan || KO (Right cross) || 5 || 2:59 ||8–2
|-  bgcolor="#CCFFCC"
| 2007-07-01 || Win ||align=left| Ganba Kuroda || NJKF "Fighting Evolution VIII" || Bunkyō, Tokyo, Japan || TKO (Corner stoppage) || 5 || 0:35 ||7–2
|-  bgcolor="#FFBBBB"
| 2007-01-28 || Loss ||align=left| Yoryut || NJKF "Fighting Evolution II" || Bunkyō, Tokyo, Japan || Decision (Unanimous) || 5 || 3:00 ||6–2
|-  bgcolor="#CCFFCC"
| 2006-11-23 || Win ||align=left| Orokamono || NJKF "Advance X" || Bunkyō, Tokyo, Japan || TKO (Corner stoppage) || 3 || 0:20 ||6–1
|-  bgcolor="#CCFFCC"
| 2006-09-24 || Win ||align=left| Mishima || NJKF "Advance VIII" || Bunkyō, Tokyo, Japan || KO (Right hook) || 2 || 2:17 ||5–1
|-  bgcolor="#CCFFCC"
| 2006-07-02 || Win ||align=left| Hideo || NJKF "Advance VI" || Bunkyō, Tokyo, Japan || Decision (Unanimous) || 3 || 3:00 ||4–1
|-  bgcolor="#CCFFCC"
| 2006-05-14 || Win ||align=left| Kozaru || NJKF "Advance V Young Fight" || Bunkyō, Tokyo, Japan || Decision (Unanimous) || 3 || 3:00 ||3–1
|-  bgcolor="#FFBBBB"
| 2006-01-15 || Loss ||align=left| Ikki || NJKF "Advance I" || Bunkyō, Tokyo, Japan || Decision (Unanimous) || 3 || 3:00 ||2–1
|-  bgcolor="#CCFFCC"
| 2005-09-24 || Win ||align=left| Takuya Minekawa || NJKF "Infinity Challenge VIII" || Bunkyō, Tokyo, Japan || TKO || 3 || 1:19|| 2–0
|-  bgcolor="#CCFFCC"
| 2005-07-31 || Win ||align=left| Eiji Ogawa || KGS "R.I.S.E. XVII" || Bunkyō, Tokyo, Japan || KO (Left low kick) || 1 || 1:15 ||1–0
|-
| colspan=9 | Legend:

See also
List of K-1 events
List of K-1 champions
List of male kickboxers

References

External links
 
Official blog (Old)
Official blog (New)
Yamato Kickboxing Gym

1987 births
Living people
People from Chita, Aichi
Sportspeople from Aichi Prefecture
Japanese male kickboxers
Lightweight kickboxers
Japanese Muay Thai practitioners
House painters